Tomosvaryella kuthyi is a species of fly in the family Pipunculidae.

Distribution
Austria, Belgium, Great Britain, Bulgaria, Canary Islands, Croatia, Czech Republic, Denmark, Finland, France, Germany, Hungary, Italy, Crete, Latvia, Romania, Slovakia, Slovenia, Spain, Switzerland, Netherlands.

References

Pipunculidae
Insects described in 1944
Diptera of Europe